House of Ill Fame is the first full-length album by Canadian hard rock band The Trews. It was released in 2003 by the label Epic Records. The group issued a music video for the more-alternative rock sounding song "Not Ready to Go". The album was certified Gold (50,000 copies) in Canada in June 2005.

Track listing

A limited edition was also released with a bonus CD of live tracks recorded on September 24, 2004 at the Event In The Tent, St. Catharines, Ontario, Canada presented by the Extreme Music Series.ca.

References

2003 debut albums
The Trews albums
Epic Records albums